is the third single by Japanese singer Chisato Moritaka. Written by Hiromasa Ijichi and Ken Shima, the single was released by Warner Pioneer on February 25, 1988.

The music video features studio clips and footage from Moritaka's 1987 debut concert Get Smile - Live at Nihon Seinenkan.

Chart performance 
"Get Smile" peaked at No. 28 on Oricon's singles chart and sold 14,000 copies.

Other versions 
A rock arrangement of "Get Smile" was recorded on the 1989 greatest hits album Moritaka Land.

The live version of the song is arranged differently with a faster tempo and heavier instrumentals. This version was recorded as "Get Smile (Concert Arrange Version)" on the 1991 remix album The Moritaka.

Moritaka re-recorded the song on vocals and drums and uploaded the video on her YouTube channel on January 2, 2013. This version is also included in Moritaka's 2013 self-covers DVD album Love Vol. 3.

Track listing

Personnel 
 Chisato Moritaka – vocals
 Ken Shima – keyboards
 Takayuki Negishi – synthesizer programming
 Hideo Saitō – guitar, backing vocals
 Chiharu Mikuzugi – bass
 Jake H. Concepcion – tenor saxophone
 Yukari Fujio – backing vocals

Chart positions

References

External links 
 
 
 

1988 singles
1988 songs
Japanese-language songs
Chisato Moritaka songs
Songs with lyrics by Hiromasa Ijichi
Warner Music Japan singles